Ocorian is a provider of trust, administration and fiduciary services for companies, institutions, individuals and funds. The company has connections to the offshore magic circle. It was founded  in Jersey as law firm Bedell Cristin, with Bedell Trust providing financial services.

History 
Advocate George Bedell set up his practice at 21 Hill Street, Saint Helier, Jersey in 1939. He had previously been commissioned to introduce income tax to the island and was appointed first controller of income tax for Jersey in 1928. 
After moving back to England during World War II, he returned to Jersey and set up in partnership with another lawyer, Dick Cristin, founding Bedell and Cristin in 1958.
Dick Cristin helped pioneer the abolition of the statutory 5% cap on interest rates in 1962.
In 1971 it expanded into managing trusts, in its division known as Bedell Trust.

The company operates in other locations, including Luxembourg, Ireland, the Netherlands, Malta, the Isle of Man, Guernsey, the British Virgin Islands, Cayman Islands, Bermuda, Mauritius, Singapore, Hong Kong, and the United Arab Emirates.

In September 2016, management completed a private equity-backed buyout. Inflexion private equity provided financing, although exact terms were not disclosed.
Bedell Trust (the investment business of the Bedell Group) rebranded to Ocorian in November 2016, keeping the Bedell Cristin for the legal business.
With funding from Inflexion, Ocorian acquired Capco Trust, which is also based on Jersey, MAS International, a fund administration and corporate services provider in Luxembourg, Mauritius and the US, and ABAX, based in Mauritius. Nick Cawley headed the combined trust company.

In 2018, the law firm Solomon Harris in the Caymen Islands merged into Bedell Cristin.
In February 2020, Estera merged into Ocorian, after announcing their intention in July, 2019.
In March, 2020, Bedell Cristin signed the first virtual affidavit, due to the COVID-19 pandemic.

References

Companies of Jersey
Offshore law firms
Offshore magic circle